Grady Emmett Adkins (June 29, 1897 – March 31, 1966), nicknamed "Butcher Boy", was a professional baseball player who played two seasons for the Chicago White Sox of Major League Baseball.

External links

1897 births
1966 deaths
People from Jacksonville, Arkansas
Major League Baseball pitchers
Baseball players from Arkansas
Chicago White Sox players